The Medicare for All Caucus is a congressional caucus in the United States House of Representatives, consisting of members that advocate for the implementation of a single-payer healthcare system. It was announced by progressive members of the House of Representatives in July 2018 with over 70 founding members, all Democrats.

Electoral results

House of Representatives

Members

Former members 
California
Jerry McNerney (CA-9) retired
Karen Bass (CA-37)  ran for Mayor of Los Angeles (elected)
Lucille Roybal-Allard (CA-40) retired
Alan Lowenthal (CA-47) retired

Colorado

 Jared Polis (CO-2) ran for governor of Colorado (elected)

Hawaii
Tulsi Gabbard (HI-2) ran for U.S. President (lost)

Georgia
John Lewis (GA-5) deceased

Florida
Alcee Hastings (FL-20) deceased
Kentucky

John Yarmuth (KY-3) retired

Maryland
Anthony Brown (MD-4) ran for Attorney General of Maryland (elected)

Massachusetts 

 Mike Capuano, defeated in 2018 primary by current Rep. Ayanna Pressley (MA-7), who, as of September 2018, does favor Medicare-for All.

Michigan
Andy Levin (MI-9) lost redistricting race to Haley Stevens.
Brenda Lawrence (MI-14) retiredMinnesota

 Keith Ellison, ran for Attorney General of Minnesota (elected) Rick Nolan, retiredMissouri
William Lacy Clay, defeated in 2020 primary by current Rep. Cori Bush (MO-1), who, as of January 2021, does favor Medicare for All. 

New York
Carolyn Maloney (NY-12) lost redistricting race to Jerrold NadlerJosé Serrano (NY-15) retiredEliot Engel, defeated in 2020 primary by current Rep. Jamaal Bowman (NY-16), who, as of December 2020, does favor Medicare for All.

Ohio
Marcia Fudge (OH-11), appointed United States Secretary of Housing and Urban DevelopmentTim Ryan (OH-13) ran for U.S. Senate (lost)Oregon
Peter DeFazio (OR-4) retiredPennsylvania
Mike Doyle (PA-18) retired.

Vermont
Peter Welch (VT-AL) ran for U.S. Senate (elected)''.

References 

Caucuses of the United States Congress
Ideological caucuses of the United States Congress